Ahousaht, also spelled Ahousat ( or ), is the principal settlement on Flores Island, in British Columbia, Canada. Accessible only by water or air, Ahousaht is a small community   predominantly composed of First Nations people from the Nuu-chah-nulth nation.  The settlement is named for the Ahousaht subgroup of the Nuu-chah-nulth, whose modern Indian Act government is the Ahousaht First Nation which combines the Ahousaht, Manhousaht and Keltsmaht under one administration.  The other main settlement of the Ahousaht First Nation is at Marktosis.

References 

 ("Old Ahousat")

External links
 Ahousaht First Nation website

Populated coastal places in Canada
Indian reserves in British Columbia
Clayoquot Sound region
Nuu-chah-nulth

hr:Ahousaht